Osleston is a hamlet which together with Thurvaston makes up the parish of Osleston and Thurvaston. The civil parish population at the 2011 Census was 267.

In 1848, Osleston, (with Thurvaston), was a place, in the parish of Sutton-on-the-Hill It was recorded as having , of which 842 are in Orleston hamlet, and 746 in that of Thurvaston; in each is a small rural village, and the township also includes the scattered village of Cropper, where the Primitive Methodists have a place of worship.

See also
Listed buildings in Osleston and Thurvaston

References

Hamlets in Derbyshire
Towns and villages of the Peak District
South Derbyshire District